Jacob Erik Lange (3 April 1767 – 5 April 1825) was a Norwegian military officer and politician.

History 
He was born in Bergen. He represented the Second Trondhjemske Regiment at the Norwegian Constituent Assembly in 1814, together with Helmer Andersen Gjedeboe.

References

1767 births
1825 deaths
Military personnel from Bergen
Norwegian Army personnel
Norwegian military personnel of the Napoleonic Wars
Fathers of the Constitution of Norway